A firstborn (also known as an eldest child or sometimes firstling) is the first child born to in the birth order of a couple through childbirth. Historically, the role of the firstborn child has been socially significant, particularly for a firstborn son in patriarchal societies. In law, many systems have incorporated the concept of primogeniture, wherein the firstborn child inherits their parent's property. The firstborn in Judaism, the bechor, is also accorded a special position.

While an only child will by definition also always be the "firstborn", in larger families the firstborn often perceives themself to be treated differently from later children.

History 
Alfred Adler (1870–1937), an Austrian psychiatrist, and a contemporary of Sigmund Freud and Carl Jung, was one of the first theorists to suggest that birth order influences personality in the late twentieth century and early twenty-first century. He argued that birth order can leave an indelible impression on an individual's style of life, which is one's habitual way of dealing with the tasks of friendship, love, and work. According to Adler, firstborns are "dethroned" when a second child comes along, and this may have a lasting influence on them. Younger and only children may be pampered and spoiled, which can also affect their later personalities.

Nurture 
The first born is often raised with more attention than the following child or children, which causes the first born child to develop certain characteristics. This is because a couple, which decides to have their first child, is inexperienced and new to raising a child which causes them to be extra aware and concerned for the child. The treatment of a parent to a firstborn may cause the child to become jealous or bitter towards the next child or children to come. The way siblings of a firstborn act towards them and the expectations from the people around them are also factors of the way their character develops. Although firstborns are different genders, there are qualities that surpass the difference due to the child's environment. Studies showed an effect on both personality and IQ of a child when comparing the order of birth. When conducting these studies, parents are interviewed and give examples on the type of personality each child expresses.

Roles 
When examining answers from organized studies, personality and attitude traits are repeated when comparing different children born into the same birth order. These findings have been criticized.

In specified cases, the firstborn child that was studied on was observed again as an adult and continued to demonstrate the identical traits as seen when they were a child. When studying famous and historic geniuses in the artistic field, recurrence has demonstrated firstborns to be the children with a creative side as well as being the productive ones. This study also ties together with being an only child. One study indicates that people surround themselves with others associated with their own birth order. "Firstborns are more likely to associate with firstborns, middle-borns with middle-borns, lastborns with lastborns, and only children with only children." It is also common to have traits that show a strong personality which is capable of leading or acting more mature. This study was related to the U.S presidents when it was discovered that more than half were firstborn, the rest were middle and four were lastborn. After investigating the birth order of the U.S presidents, important leaders were also looked at and showed the same outcome; a large number of every type of leader was firstborn rather than last.

Birth order, and the role of the firstborn, can become complicated in non-nuclear families, with situations such as parents of one child or set of children separating from each other and entering relationships with other people, and then having children with their new partners. In such instances, the first child born in the new relationship may be considered the firstborn for that couple, even though it may not be the first child born to either partner in the couple.

Criticism 

The effects of birth order have been repeatedly challenged; the largest multi-study research suggests zero or near-zero effects. Birth-order theory has been asserted to have the characteristics of a "zombie theory".

References

Family